The C. Hart Merriam Base Camp Site is a historic campsite in Coconino National Forest, north of Flagstaff, Arizona.  It is significant for its association with Clinton Hart Merriam (1855–1942), the United States' first eco-biologist.  The site was designated a National Historic Landmark in 1965.

Description and history
The Arizona Trail passes near the  Merriam Base Camp Site.

This camp is the site from which Clinton Hart Merriam, then head of a predecessor of the United States Fish and Wildlife Service, performed the fieldwork and research leading to the development of the ecological concept of the life zone.  He described life zones in the San Francisco Mountains, in which the distribution of animal and plant life was described with respect to latitude, altitude, and other environmental factors.  Merriam's work in this area was flawed but important, driving the development and refinement of what was then a new concept.

See also
 List of National Historic Landmarks in Arizona
 National Register of Historic Places listings in Coconino County, Arizona

References

External links
 

Geography of Coconino County, Arizona
National Historic Landmarks in Arizona
National Register of Historic Places in Coconino County, Arizona
Coconino National Forest